Broker is a 2010 Telugu film written, composed and directed by R. P. Patnaik who also portrays the lead role in the film. Kannada film Agraja (2014) was loosely inspired from this film. A sequel titled Broker 2 was released in 2014.

Plot
Ganapati alias Gani is a mediator who has a lot of contacts with politicians and government officers. Several people approach him and offer bribe to the officials to get their things done quickly. He is the right hand of a big politician in dealing with land encroachments. He also saves a corrupt officer Dharmateja when ACB officials rides his house and got suspended. Many people suffer due to this. Once he helps his old teacher to receive his retirement benefits in exchange for a bribe. Being principled, he kills himself when he learns of it. Gani also loses his son in a fly-over collapse incident. Gani helped the contractor in getting the project from officials through bribes. His wife hates him because of his lobbying job. But he continues.

He meets Dharmateja and knows about his charity work. He explains to him why he is a changed man now. Gani feels guilty for all his past actions, and goes to a TV studio to reveal all the connections he had with corrupt officials and the amount of money they had taken as bribes. He reveals a couple of connections which shocks everybody. Then he refuses to reveal all the names, requesting those corrupt officials reveal themselves. Many calls from throughout the state inundate the TV station. The Chief minister declares that there would no cases against those who voluntarily surrendered their illegal money and it would be utilized for the people.

Cast
 R. P. Patnaik as Ganapathi
 Asha Saini as Ganapathi's wife
 Kota Srinivasa Rao as Corrupt politician
 Gollapudi Maruti Rao as a retired school teacher
 Srihari as Dharma Teja
 M. V. S. Haranatha Rao as Chief Minister
 Y. Kasi Viswanath as a corrupt officer
 Suresh as Surya Prakash, TV9 journalist
 Banerjee as CBI Officer
 Veda Sastry as Harini, TV9 Reporter
 Surekha Vani as Surekha, Dharma Teja's wife
 Chalapathi Rao as Flyover Builder
 Keerthi Chawla as Film actress Urvasi (guest appearance)
 Shankar Melkote
 Dharmavarapu Subramanyam as a man who sells plots on the moon
 Bharath Reddy as Inspector Surya, Harini's fiancé
 Giri

Soundtrack
The album consists of 5 songs composed by R. P. Patnaik.

Track list
 01 – "Kukka Thoka Vankara" – (sung by: Simha)
 02 – "Atu Vangapadu" – (sung by: Yadagiri, Geetha Madhuri)
 03 – "Purudu Posthe Lancham" – (sung by: Priya Subrahmanyam)
 04 – "Sare Jahase Acha" – (sung by: Sreeram Chandra)
 05 – "Bolo Jai Jai Jai Ganapathi" – (sung by: Hemachandra)

Awards
 Nandi Award for Best Story Writer – R. P. Patnaik

References

 http://www.atozmp3.in/broker-2010-telugu-mp3-songs-download.html

External links

Indian political thriller films
2010s Telugu-language films